Thalamus Ltd (also known as Thalamus) was a British computer game developer that published titles for a number of 8-bit and 16-bit platforms during the late 1980s and early 1990s.

History

Genesis
Thalamus Ltd was created in 1986 as an in-house software publishing label of British magazine publisher Newsfield Publications Ltd, to take advantage of their leading position publishing computer game magazines, such as Crash and Zzap!64, during the mid-1980s. Ex-Activision PR Manager Andrew Wright was assigned the position of Company Director and Newsfield staff writer Gary Liddon was appointed Technical Executive. The company was initially based in Canonbury, North London, in an office shared with staff of Newsfield's newly launched lifestyle magazine LM.

First titles
Thalamus capitalised on the success of the Commodore 64 gaming scene by releasing their first batch of titles on this platform. Having established numerous contacts within the C64 development scene through the popularity of their Zzap!64 gaming magazine, Thalamus were able to sign up Finnish programmer Stavros Fasoulas to develop their first three titles, Sanxion, Delta and Quedex. Sanxion was the first release to bear the Thalamus name, and it garnered a Sizzler rating from Zzap!64 - this led to accusations of favouritism from rival publication Commodore User. Rob Hubbard provided the music for the first two titles, while Matt Gray provided the music for Quedex. "Thalamusik", the loading tune that accompanied the C64 version of Sanxion proved to be so popular amongst fans that Zzap!64 later included a full synthesised version on one of their cover cassettes.

The C64 version of Delta popularised the concept of the Mix-E-Load loading system. Provided as standard on the cassette versions of each game (and as a bonus on the floppy disk versions), the Mix-E-Load system allowed players to remix the loading music of the game, in real time, as the main program loaded in the background. Mix-E-Load was created by Gary Liddon in conjunction with Rob Hubbard and derived from an idea by Nick Pelling, author of well known BBC Micro games Frak! and Firetrack.

The staff changes
During the development of Delta, Liddon and Wright both left Thalamus, with Wright returning to Activision and Liddon pursuing a career in games programming. Ex Quicksilva & Electric Dreams development manager Paul Cooper was brought on board to head up the company and moved the offices from London to Aldermaston in Berkshire.

Stavros Fasoulas returned to Finland for National Service, so for their next release Thalamus turned to upcoming C64 programmer Martin Walker. Having already programmed the well-received C64 titles Rupert and the Toymaker's Party, Chameleon and Back to the Future, Martin Walker delivered an innovative puzzle/shooter hybrid named Hunter's Moon. Despite a favourable response from critics, the game didn't sell as well as previous Thalamus titles.

In the second half of 1988, Thalamus returned from a period of relative silence with two new titles. Hawkeye marked the commercial debut of The Boys Without Brains, a Dutch collective who had already made a name for themselves within the C64 demo scene. The game was a side-scroller with colourful graphics and a soundtrack from Jeroen Tel. Armalyte was a shoot-'em-up in the spirit of R-Type, originally conceived as its own unique identity but publicised as a sequel to Delta.

As the 1980s drew to a close, Thalamus continued to release C64 games, including the surreal puzzle/shooter Snare, the horizontal scroller Retrograde, from the Rowlands brothers and Heatseeker, a platform game with an environmental theme by Paul O'Malley. A brief experimentation with the ZX Spectrum format saw conversions of Sanxion and Delta being released, but by this time the Spectrum market was in decline and Thalamus decided to halt development of a number of Spectrum projects.

Final titles and dissolution
Thalamus entered the 1990s with a few more C64 titles, including Creatures and Creatures II: Torture Trouble from the Rowlands brothers, which have been lauded by several computer magazines for the strength of their gameplay and graphics on the aging machine. Cartoon-style platformers Summer Camp and Winter Camp were also released. In 1991, Newsfield ran into serious financial trouble. Newsfield were forced to halt publication of their popular gaming magazines. Europress stepped in to save the magazines, but they slowly died out over the next year or two as their respective markets dwindled.

Thalamus managed to survive the liquidation of Newsfield, but funds were running low. With 8-bit gaming being superseded by 16-bit gaming, production costs were rising, forcing hundreds of independent publishers, such as Thalamus, to either close down or allow themselves to be consumed by a publishing giant. Thalamus released their final C64 game, Nobby the Aardvark in 1993. With their various Amiga projects spiraling out of budget and no further income, Thalamus had no choice but to close down their operations.

List of games

Commercial releases
Sanxion (1986, C64)
Delta (1987, C64)
Quedex (1987, C64)
Hunter's Moon (1987, C64)
Armalyte (1988, C64)
Armalyte: Competition Edition (1988, C64)
Hawkeye (1988, C64)
Snare (1989, C64)
Retrograde (1989, C64)
Sanxion: The Spectrum Remix (1989, Spectrum/Spectrum 128)
Hawkeye (1989, Amiga)
Armalyte (1990, Amstrad CPC)
Q8 Team Ford Rally Simulation (1990, Amstrad CPC)
Delta Charge (1990, Spectrum)
Creatures (1990, C64)
Summer Camp (1990, C64)
Heatseeker (1990, C64)
Venom Wing (1990, Amiga)
Digital Musician (1990, Amiga)
Mindroll (1990, Amiga)
Armalyte: The Final Run (1991, Amiga)
Creatures (1992, Atari St)
Creatures II: Torture Trouble (1992, C64)
Winter Camp (1992, C64/Amiga)
Borobodur (1992, Amiga)
Nobby the Aardvark (1993, C64)
Creatures (1993, Amiga)
S.U.B. (1993, Amiga/PC)

Unreleased titles
Starline (1987, C64)
Bamboo (1989, C64)
Q8 Team Ford Rally Simulation (1990, Spectrum)
The Search for Sharla (1990, Spectrum, C64, Amiga)
Creatures (1990, Spectrum)
Armalyte (1990, Spectrum) - a demo version of one level was released.
Armalyte II (1990, C64)
Bombuzal (1990, Spectrum)
Delta Patrol (1992, Amiga)
Arsenal FC (1992, Amiga)
Beastmaster (1992, Amiga)
Nobby the Aardvark (1992, Amiga)
Street Warriors (1993, Amiga)
Restrictor (1993, Amiga and Atari ST)

References

External links
Thalamus History article at C64HQ
Interview with former Thalamus programmer Richard Underhill
Gordon Houghton's Zzap!64 pages

Defunct video game companies of the United Kingdom
Video game companies established in 1986
1986 establishments in the United Kingdom